Richard Bruce Parkinson (born 25 May 1963) is a British Egyptologist and academic. He is Professor of Egyptology at the University of Oxford and a fellow of The Queen's College, Oxford. Until December 2013 he was a curator in the Department of Ancient Egypt and Sudan, British Museum.

Early life and education
Parkinson was born on 25 May 1963. He was educated at Barnard Castle School, then an all-boys private school in Barnard Castle, County Durham. He read Oriental Studies (Egyptology with Coptic) at The Queen's College, University of Oxford, and graduated in 1985 with a first class Bachelor of Arts (BA) degree. He then undertook research for his Doctor of Philosophy (DPhil) degree. His doctoral thesis was a commentary on The Tale of the Eloquent Peasant and was submitted in 1988.

Academic career
Parkinson was a Teaching Fellow at the Oriental Institute, University of Oxford from 1988 to 1989. From 1989 to 1991, he worked at the Department of Egyptian Antiquities, British Museum as a Special Assistant in epigraphy. He then became the Lady Wallis Budge Junior Research Fellow in Egyptology at University College, Oxford.

In 1991, Parkinson became a curator of the British Museum as Assistant Keeper of Ancient Egyptian pharaonic culture. His responsibilities included the maintenance and publication of ancient papyri written in Egyptian hieroglyphs and cursive hieratic, as well as inscribed material such as the Rosetta stone. He was the supervisor of archived material, collections, and epigraphy, and the curator of the Nebamun wall-paintings. He remained at the British Museum until the end of 2013.

On 1 October 2013, Parkinson was appointed Professor of Egyptology in the Faculty of Oriental Studies, University of Oxford. Spending the first term part-time, he took on the position full-time in January 2014. His inaugural lecture about the impact of ancient Egyptian poetry was accompanied by the actress and novelist Barbara Ewing, and was podcast. He is a fellow of the Queen's College, Oxford, and has been a director of the Griffith Institute, Oxford.

From 1993 to 1998, Parkinson was editor of the Journal of Egyptian Archaeology. He has been a visiting lecturer at the University of Göttingen in 2006, at the University of Cologne in 2009 and 2013, and the University of Mainz in 2011.

Parkinson's main area of research is the interpretation of Ancient Egyptian literature. As well as academic monographs and articles, he has written popular books on Egyptology and also a short LGBT world history, dedicated to his husband. In 2016 he gave the Oxford University annual LGBT History Month lecture on this, which was podcast: https://podcasts.ox.ac.uk/great-unrecorded-history-lgbt-heritage-and-world-cultures. In 2004 he collaborated in a translation of Beatrix Potter's The Tale of Peter Rabbit into hieroglyphs.

Honours
Parkinson was awarded an honorary doctorate from the New Bulgarian University, Sofia in 2006 for his contributions to Egyptology.

Personal life
Parkinson is openly gay. He entered into a civil partnership with Timothy Griffiths Reid in 2005, and this was converted into marriage in 2014.

Parkinson has type 1 diabetes and has spoken about the intense difficulties of this condition in an academic environment.

Bibliography
Books

Articles

See also
List of Egyptologists
The Eloquent Peasant
Ancient Egyptian literature

References

British Egyptologists
Employees of the British Museum
Alumni of The Queen's College, Oxford
Living people
1963 births
Professors of Egyptology (University of Oxford)
Fellows of The Queen's College, Oxford
English LGBT people
People educated at Barnard Castle School
People from Darlington